Trichotomine is a bright blue pigment found in the berries of the plant Clerodendrum trichotomum, which is native to China and Japan. It has a novel chromophore structure which differs from previously studied plant pigments.

References 

Biological pigments